Aalbers, Aalberse and Aalberts are Dutch patronymic surnames meaning "son of Aalbert". People with this name include:

Aalbers
 Albert Aalbers (1897–1961), Dutch architect
 Karel Aalbers (born 1949), Dutch businessman and president of football club Vitesse
Aalberse
 , pseudonym of Johannes van Keulen (1917–1983), Dutch writer
 Piet Aalberse Sr. (1871–1948), Dutch Government Minister and Speaker of the House
 , Dutch politician, son of the above
Aalberts
  (born 1952), Dutch politician in Friesland
 Jan Aalberts (born 1939), Dutch founder of Aalberts Industries

References 

Dutch-language surnames
Patronymic surnames